Poor Girls is a 1927 silent film drama directed by William James Craft and starring Dorothy Revier. It was produced and distributed by Columbia Pictures.

The film is preserved in the Library of Congress collections.

Cast
Dorothy Revier - Peggy Warren
Edmund Burns- Richard Deane
Ruth Stonehouse Katherine Warren/Texas Kate
Lloyd Whitlock - Witlard
Marjorie Bonner - Vivian Stewart

References

External links
Poor Girls @ IMDb.com

poster

1927 films
American silent feature films
Columbia Pictures films
Films directed by William James Craft
1927 drama films
American black-and-white films
Silent American drama films
1920s American films